Neobeyeria is a genus of rove beetles in the family Staphylinidae. There is one described species in Neobeyeria, N. arizonensis.

References

Further reading

 
 
 

Aleocharinae
Taxa named by Farouk A. Abdel-Galil
Articles created by Qbugbot